The God Worshipping Society, in its literal translation Emperor Worshipping Society, was a religious movement founded and led by Hong Xiuquan which drew on his own unique interpretation of Protestant Christianity and combined it with Chinese folk religion, based on the faith in Shangdi (the Emperor), and other religious traditions. According to historical evidence, his first contact with Christian pamphlets occurred in 1836 when he directly received American Congregationalist missionary Edwin Stevens' personal copy of the Good Words to Admonish the Age (by Liang Fa, 1832). He only briefly looked over and did not carefully examine it. Subsequently, Hong claimed to have experienced mystical visions in the wake of his third failure of the imperial examinations in 1837 and after failing for a fourth time in 1843, he sat down to carefully examine the tracts with his distant cousin Feng Yunshan, believing that they were "the key to interpreting his visions" coming to the conclusion that he was "the son of God the Father, Shangdi, and the younger brother of Jesus Christ who had been directed to rid the world of demon worship (that means, submission to the Qing dynasty, according to Xiuquan the Qing were demons that oppressed the Han ethnic majority)."

Beliefs
The Emperor Worshipping Society believed in Divine filiation, the scriptural concept that all Christian believers become sons and daughters of God when redeemed by Christ. Hong did not claim to have a supernatural birth; Hong Xiuquan was merely regarded as the second eldest son of Shangdi after Jesus Christ, with Feng Yunshan as third eldest son, and Yang Xiuqing the fourth eldest.

Formation
Beginning with Robert Morrison in 1807, Protestant missionaries began working from Macao, Pazhou (known at the time as "Whampoa"), and Guangzhou ("Canton"). Their household staff and the printers they employed for Morrison's dictionary and translation of the Bible—men like Cai Gao, Liang Afa, and Qu Ya'ang—were their first converts and suffered greatly, being repeatedly arrested, fined, and driven into exile at Malacca. However, they corrected and adapted the missionaries' message to reach the Chinese, printing thousands of tracts of their own devising. Unlike the westerners, they were able to travel through the interior of the country and began to particularly frequent the prefectural and provincial examinations, where local scholars competed for the chance to rise to power in the imperial civil service. One of the native tracts, Liang's nine-part, 500-page tome, Good Words to Admonish the Age, found its way into the hands of Hong Xiuquan in the mid-1830s, although it remains a matter of debate during which exact examination this occurred. Hong initially leafed through it without interest.

Feng Yunshan formed the Society of Emperor Worshippers in Guangxi after a missionary journey there in 1844 to spread Hong's ideas. In 1847, Hong became the leader of the secret society. The Taiping faith, inspired by missionary Christianity, says one historian, "developed into a dynamic new Chinese religion ... Taiping Christianity". Hong presented this religion as a revival and a restoration of the ancient classical faith in Shangdi, a faith that had been displaced by Confucianism (its corrupted version, used by the Qing to submit the Han) and dynastic imperial regimes. The next year, Hong and Feng Yunshan, Hong's distant cousin and one of the earliest converts to Hong's faith, traveled to Sigu, Guiping county, Guangxi to preach their version of Christianity. In November 1844, Hong returned home without Feng, who remained in the area and continued to preach. After Hong's departure, Feng traveled deeper and deeper into the heart of the Thistle Mountain region, preaching and baptizing new converts. Feng christened this group of believers the "Emperor Worshipping Society". Hakkas from this area, generally poor and beset by both bandits and local Chinese families angry at the presence of the Hakka in their ancestral lands, found refuge in the group with its promise of solidarity.

While the Emperor Worshipping Society shared some similar characteristics with traditional Chinese secret societies, it differed in that the participants adopted a new religious faith that firmly rejected Chinese tradition as for the one established by the Manchu regime, since they believed that they were following the Chinese tradition, but the original, the Han tradition. The Society was militant from its inception, due to the prevalence of both intervillage fighting and conflicts between Hakka and non-Hakka villagers. Generally, individuals did not convert alone, but rather entire families, clans, occupational groups, or even villages would convert en masse. On 27 August 1847, when Hong Xiuquan returned to the Thistle Mountains, the Emperor Worshipers numbered over 2,000. At this time, most Emperor Worshippers were peasants and miners.

Growth
With Hong's return, the Emperor Worshipping Society took on a more rebellious character. Hong began to describe himself as a king and explicitly identified the ruling Manchus and their supporters as demons which must be destroyed. The Emperor Worshippers treated their entire community as a family, leading to establishment of a common treasury and a requirement of chastity.

In January 1848, Feng Yunshan was arrested and banished to Guangdong. Hong Xiuquan left for Guangdong shortly thereafter to reunite with Feng. In the absence of both Feng and Hong, two new leaders emerged to fill the void: Yang Xiuqing and Xiao Chaogui. Both claimed to enter trances which allowed them to speak as a member of the Trinity: God the Father (Shangdi) in the case of Yang and Jesus Christ in the case of Xiao. While speaking as Jesus or Shangdi, Xiao and Yang would necessarily have more authority than even Hong Xiuquan. Upon their return in the summer of 1849, Hong and Feng investigated Yang and Xiao's claims and declared them to be genuine.

Jintian Uprising

In February 1850, local corps passed through a number of Emperor Worshipping villages and threatened to kill the converts. In response, Feng Yunshan began to call for open revolt by the Emperor Worshippers. In July 1850, the Emperor Worshipper's leaders directed their followers to converge in Jintian and quickly amassed a force of 10,000–30,000 people. While the majority of the group were Hakka, some followers were Punti, Miao, or members of other local tribal groups. Membership in the Emperor Worshippers was eclectic; they counted businessmen, refugees, farmers, mercenaries, and members of secret societies and mutual-protection alliances among their ranks. The Emperor Worshippers were also joined by a number of bandit groups, including several thousand pirates led by Luo Dagang.

The Taiping Heavenly Kingdom

On the 11th day of the first lunar month of 1851, which was also Hong Xiuquan's birthday, the Emperor Worshipping Society proclaimed the Jintian Uprising against the ruling Qing dynasty, and declared the formation of the Taiping Heavenly Kingdom, thus beginning the Taiping Rebellion, which has been described as the "most gigantic man-made disaster" of the nineteenth century. The God worshippers trained to fight were considered Protestant revolutionaries.

See also
 Millennarianism in colonial societies

Footnotes

Notes

Sources 

 Works cited
 
 
 
 

History of Christianity in China
Chinese cults
Religion in Qing dynasty
19th century in China
1843 establishments in China
Taiping Heavenly Kingdom
Christian denominations founded in China